Engelhorn may refer to:

Curt Engelhorn (1926–2016), German businessman
Grosses Engelhorn, a mountain in Switzerland
Friedrich Engelhorn (1821–1902), German businessman, founder of BASF
Shirley Englehorn (1940-2022), American golfer